Hatchet II is a 2010 American slasher film written and directed by Adam Green, and the second installment in the Hatchet film series. Picking up right where the first film ended, Hatchet II follows Marybeth as she escapes the clutches of the deformed, swamp-dwelling killer Victor Crowley. After learning the truth about her family's connection to the hatchet-wielding madman, Marybeth returns to the Louisiana swamps along with an army of hunters to recover the bodies of her family and exact the bloodiest revenge against the bayou butcher.

The film sees the return of Kane Hodder and Tony Todd who portrayed Victor Crowley and Reverend Zombie in the 2006 film, respectively. Danielle Harris portrays Marybeth, a role originally played by Tamara Feldman. The film was originally screened at the 2010 London FrightFest Film Festival on August 26, 2010. It was released unrated in the United States on October 1, 2010.

Plot
Immediately after Hatchet, Marybeth Dunston is attacked by Victor Crowley, but manages to escape. Jack Cracker finds her and takes her back to his cabin, but forces her to leave after finding out her last name,  telling her to visit Reverend Zombie. Not long after she leaves, Jack is killed by Victor Crowley.

Marybeth returns to Reverend Zombie's shop, and he lets her in. After learning her last name, he tells her that her father Sampson was one of the boys responsible for causing the fire that led to Victor Crowley's death. He also gives her more details on Victor's backstory; Thomas, Victor's father, had cheated on his wife Shyann with her nurse Lena after Shyann was diagnosed with stomach cancer. Moments before dying, Shyann placed a curse on the child conceived by Lena from the affair. Months later, Lena gave birth to Victor Crowley, but died of fright after seeing Victor's deformed face.
	
Marybeth tells Reverend Zombie she wants to go back and retrieve the remains of her father and brother. He agrees, but tells her she must bring a family member with her. After she leaves, Zombie calls Justin (the brother of Shawn from the first film), and tells him to summon a group of hunters (specifically including a man named Trent Graves) to go with them. Marybeth returns home, where her uncle Bob promptly shows up. He reluctantly agrees to accompany her to a recruitment meeting in Zombie's shop, despite Bob's distrust of Zombie. Zombie tells the hunters he will pay them $500 each to retrieve his boat and $5,000 for the head of Victor Crowley. He tells Trent he will pay him double to go, and Trent agrees. The hunters proceed to venture into the swamp with Marybeth and her uncle.
	
As night descends, they find the boat and, as the rest leave, two of the hunters, Cletus and Chad stay by the boat while the others fan out. Marybeth, Zombie, Justin, Bob and Trent look for Crowley's shed, as well as the bodies of his victims. Along the way, Zombie explains to Justin that Trent, Sampson and Marybeth's uncle were the kids who started the fire that led to Victor's death. Since Sampson has already been killed by Victor, Zombie believes that if Crowley kills Bob and Trent, his soul will be at peace and he will finally leave the swamp. Meanwhile, Victor begins murdering the hunters one by one, starting with Chad and Cletus, moving on to Layton and Avery, and finally killing John and Vernon. While searching the cabin, the remaining party members hear Victor outside.

As they hide, Justin tells Marybeth of Zombie's plot to get her uncle and Trent killed after Marybeth tells Justin that Shawn is dead. As she runs to warn Bob, Justin jams the door shut with a chair, but Victor appears behind him and kills him with a belt sander. Bob, in an attempt to save Justin, accidentally releases Victor, who quickly thereafter murders Trent. Meanwhile, Zombie grabs Marybeth and drags her out of the house, trapping Bob inside with Victor, who murders him. Marybeth falls to the ground in tears, and Zombie declares Victor Crowley is dead. However, Marybeth then reveals Bob was not her real uncle; her father's brother had died of leukemia when she was twelve, and Bob was instead her father's best friend. Zombie turns to see Victor breaking through the wall of the cabin, now realizing his plan to kill Victor Crowley has failed. 

Zombie advances towards Victor and attempts to choke him, but Victor kills him by severing him in half before ripping out his severed spine, effectively skinning him alive. Just after Victor tosses Zombie's skinned upper body into the woods, Marybeth strikes Victor in the forehead with his own hatchet, knocking him to the ground, before beating his head into a bloody pulp. She eventually stops and walks off, just as Victor's hand twitches. She then returns with Zombie's shotgun and fires the gun into the remains of his head, seemingly killing him.

Cast

Emma Bell appears in an uncredited cameo role as Parker O'Neal, reprising her from from Adam Green's previous film Frozen (released seven months before Hatchet II) in a scene serving as an epilogue to the events of the 2010 film.

Production

Development
Hatchet II was announced in November 2008 when Anchor Bay Entertainment released a teaser poster for the film. Adam Green stated that he would be writing and directing, depending on how long the other projects he was working on took. He also stated that if the projects took too long, he would pass writing and directing duties on to someone else. On November 24, 2009, it was officially announced that Adam Green would return to write and direct. The final draft of the script was completed on December 7, 2009. In order to keep details under wraps, even the crew did not receive copies of the script and the majority of cast only received select pages. Fake scripts, fake endings, and fake story lines were circulated around the industry and no visitors or guests were allowed near the set. The cast gathered for their first table reading on December 15, 2009.

Casting
On November 24, 2009, along with the announcement that Adam Green would return to write and direct, it was announced that Kane Hodder would reprise the role of Victor Crowley. On November 25, it was announced that Tony Todd would be returning. On December 3, 2009 scream queen Danielle Harris announced on her official Twitter account that she would be taking over the role of Marybeth, which was originally played by Tamara Feldman. On December 8, 2009, AJ Bowen and director Tom Holland joined the cast. The rest of the cast was announced on December 28, 2009, R.A. Mihailoff, Kathryn Fiore, Parry Shen, Rileah Vanderbilt, Ed Ackerman, Rick McCallum, Colton Dunn and David Foy.

Filming
To accommodate Green's promotional duties for the film Frozen shooting had to be split into two parts. The first portion began shooting on January 7, 2010 and ended on January 23. The second portion began January 15, 2010 and shooting for Hatchet II wrapped on February 24.

Release

Theatrical
Hatchet II premiered in Europe on August 26, 2010 as part of London's Frightfest. The film was released unrated in 68 theaters across the United States by AMC Theatres as part of their AMC Independent program on October 1, 2010. The film was scheduled to be released in Toronto and Montreal theaters in Canada on the same day, but it was pulled because it was not rated by the cities' provincial rating agencies. The film was also pulled from U.S. theaters on October 4.

Home media
Hatchet II was released on DVD and Blu-ray February 1, 2011.

Reception

On Rotten Tomatoes, the film has a 42% approval rating based on reviews from 36 critics. The site's consensus states, "Funnier and more gleefully gory than most slasher sequels, Hatchet II aims for so-bad-it's-good territory, but can't quite hack it." 

Metacritic, gave the film an average score of 49 out of 100, based on 11 reviews, indicating "mixed or average reviews". 
Adam Green has personally said that this entry in the series is his favorite.

References

External links
 
 
 
 
 Hatchet II at Metacritic
 

2010 comedy horror films
2010 films
2010s exploitation films
2010 independent films
2010s serial killer films
2010s slasher films
American comedy horror films
American exploitation films
American films about revenge
American independent films
American sequel films
American slasher films
American splatter films
American supernatural horror films
Films directed by Adam Green
Films set in Louisiana
Films shot in California
Films shot in New Orleans
Hatchet (film series)
2010s English-language films
2010s American films